Zhang Min (born 24 March 1976) is a Chinese former competitive figure skater. He is a two-time Four Continents medalist and a three-time Chinese national champion. He competed at three Winter Olympic Games, placing as high as tenth, and finished a career-best seventh at the 2004 World Championships.

At the 1999 Four Continents, Zhang became the first skater to land a clean quadruple toe loop in the short program at an ISU Championship. He has also landed quadruple salchows in competition. He is the second person to land three quadruple jumps in one program. At the 2006 World Championships, the day before his 30th birthday, he landed a 4T-3T combination and 4S in his free skate. He named Elvis Stojko as his idol in the sport.

Programs

Results
GP: Champions Series/Grand Prix

References

External links 
 

1976 births
Living people
Olympic figure skaters of China
Chinese male single skaters
Figure skaters at the 1994 Winter Olympics
Figure skaters at the 2002 Winter Olympics
Figure skaters at the 2006 Winter Olympics
Four Continents Figure Skating Championships medalists
Asian Games medalists in figure skating
Figure skaters at the 1996 Asian Winter Games
Figure skaters at the 2003 Asian Winter Games
Sportspeople from Qiqihar
Medalists at the 1996 Asian Winter Games
Medalists at the 2003 Asian Winter Games
Asian Games silver medalists for China
Asian Games bronze medalists for China
Universiade medalists in figure skating
Universiade bronze medalists for China
Competitors at the 1995 Winter Universiade
Competitors at the 1999 Winter Universiade
Figure skaters from Heilongjiang